The Nieuport-Delage NiD 32 was a French single-seater fighter produced by Nieuport during the period between the two World Wars. The aircraft was designed in response to a request from the French Navy for an aircraft capable of launching from a platform: the NiD 32 competed with other planes, such as the Hanriot HD.12 and the SPAD S.XV. In addition to the NiD 32, Nieuport also submitted the NiD 29. The Navy selected the Nieuport NiD 32, and set about to test it in March 1920 on a platform. The results were disappointing, as the platform could barely support the aircraft, even when it was unarmed.

Specifications (NiD-32RH)

References

Bibliography

1920s French fighter aircraft
 032
Biplanes
Rotary-engined aircraft
Single-engined tractor aircraft